Tatooine is a fictional desert planet that appears in the Star Wars franchise. It is a beige-colored, desolate world orbiting a pair of binary stars, and inhabited by human settlers and a variety of other life forms. The planet was first seen in the original 1977 film Star Wars, and has to date featured in a total of six Star Wars theatrical films, three live-action television series, and two animated series.

It is the home planet of the protagonist of the Star Wars Trilogy, Luke Skywalker, and also of his father, Anakin Skywalker (Darth Vader). It is also the planet where Obi-Wan Kenobi takes up residence under the name "Ben Kenobi" in order to watch over Luke during his exile following the events of Order 66 and Anakin's fall to the dark side. Shots of the binary sunset over the Tatooine desert are considered to be an iconic image of the film series.

Development
In his early drafts of the Star Wars story, author George Lucas changed the names of planets and characters several times. In his early treatment, Lucas opened the story on the fourth moon of the planet Utapau, the home of a young warrior called Annikin Starkiller. In Lucas's rough draft, The Star Wars (1974), the escaping droids land in a desert on the planet Aquilae; in later drafts the planet again takes the name of Utapau. Prior to production, early artwork commissioned by Lucas from conceptual illustrator Ralph McQuarrie show robots lost on a desert world, scorched by twin suns and mysterious, masked Tusken Raiders riding large horned Banthas.

George Lucas originally envisaged filming the Utapau/Tatooine scenes in Algeria (inspired by Michelangelo Antonioni's 1975 film The Passenger), Libya or Iran, but these locations were rejected by 20th Century Fox. When production began on Star Wars, production designers John Barry and Robert Watts scouted for filming locations in Morocco and Tunisia. Lucas, accompanied by producer Gary Kurtz visited the Tunisian island of Djerba with them and were impressed by the desert landscape and the unusual architecture, and selected Tunisia to provide the desert planet setting. Lucas was also keen to shoot at the Hotel Sidi Driss in Matmata, a decision which extended the shoot, and consequently the budget, by a day. Filming in Tunisia began on March 22, 1976, and immediately ran into difficulty: the region was experiencing its first heavy rainfall in seven years, which disrupted the setting of an arid desert planet. The Matmata hotel consisted of a troglodyte dwelling in a large hole in the ground. Combined with shots at Chott el Djerid, near Nefta, this formed the setting for the Lars homestead and moisture farm. The name Tatooine is not actually mentioned in the final screenplay of Star Wars—Lucas was still working on his fourth draft while scouting locations, and adapted the name from a town in southern Tunisia called Tataouine (French spelling, or Tataween spelling in Tunisian Arabic).

Certain scenes filmed on Djerba were subsequently deleted from the final cut of the film in order to improve the narrative pace. The most significant material cut was a series of scenes set in the township of Anchorhead which served to introduce the characters of Luke Skywalker and Biggs Darklighter. Lucas asked film editor Richard Chew to cut these scenes as they had been likened to "American Graffiti in outer space" by Fox executives (in reference to Lucas's 1973 film).

Footage filmed at Sidi Bouhlel in Tunisia was combined with 1977 second unit filming at Death Valley National Park in California to create the rocky canyon scenes featuring Jawas and Tusken Raiders.

When crews returned to Tunisia to film for the Star Wars prequel films in 1998, locations at Onk Jemal (Ong Jmal) in Tozeur, Ksar Ouled Soltane and Ksar Hadada, Ghomrassen were used for Tatooine scenes. Abandoned sets for the filming have been left in the desert but can be visited.

Film appearances
Tatooine originally featured in the 1977 film Star Wars, and was the first planet to be seen in the film franchise. In the opening scene, the planet and two of its moons are seen in space against a sea of stars, forming the backdrop of a space battle which sets in motion the events of the film. The droids lose their way in a sparse desert and are captured by small scavenger creatures called Jawas. When the robots are sold on to human settlers, protagonist Luke Skywalker is introduced as a young man living with his aunt and uncle on a farm. The hostility of the arid desert environment is emphasised by the depiction of sandstorms and the heat of the binary stars, as Luke watches a twin sunset over the sand dunes. Humans are constantly threatened by violent bandit creatures called Tusken Raiders. As the film progresses, various leading characters are introduced to the story in scenes set on Tatooine: Obi-Wan Kenobi, Han Solo and Chewbacca. Later Tatooine scenes take place in Mos Eisley, a gritty bustling spaceport on the planet which is a centre of smuggling and organised crime. One of the most celebrated scenes in the Star Wars saga is in the Mos Eisley cantina, a shady saloon populated by exotic alien species. Composer John Williams wrote music for the alien band in this scene in the style of swing musician Benny Goodman, and arranged with unusual instrumentation to convey an other-worldly sound. Tatooine features once again in the 1983 film Return of the Jedi, in which the story's heroes return to Tatooine to rescue Han Solo from Jabba the Hutt, a fearsome gangster who dominates the criminal underworld on Tatooine.

When the prequel trilogy revived the film franchise in 1999, the action returned to Tatooine for Episode I: The Phantom Menace as the setting for the childhood of Luke's father, Anakin Skywalker. Living as a slave in another spaceport, Mos Espa, Anakin competes in pod races, long-distance airborne races across the desert. The Jedi master Qui-Gon Jinn meets Anakin after making an emergency landing on the planet, and helps him win his freedom. In Episode II: Attack of the Clones (2002), an older Anakin returns to Tatooine to search for his mother, Shmi, who has been kidnapped by Tusken Raiders. The prequels depict a vast expanse of desert with jagged rock formations. Tatooine features once more in the final prequel film, Episode III: Revenge of the Sith (2005); in the closing scene, Obi-Wan Kenobi takes the infant Luke Skywalker and delivers him to his adoptive parents on the Tatooine moisture farm while he goes into hiding by residing in the Junland Wastelands which are in Tatooine's mountainous areas, thus explaining his first appearance in that location in the Episode IV.

Tatooine appears briefly at the end of The Rise of Skywalker, when Rey visits the remains of the Lars moisture farm.

Description

Located in an unknown galaxy's desolate Outer Rim, Tatooine orbits a pair of binary  stars,  I and  II. The planet's indigenous lifeforms such as the womp rat, bantha, Sarlacc, and Krayt dragon are well-adapted to its arid climate. Though its proximity to the suns makes life difficult, it is located near key hyperspace routes, making it a smuggler and gangster haven; debris from shipwrecks also provides resources for scavengers. Annual sandstorms wipe out landmarks and make nomadic life dangerous, with the planet's populations clustered into distinct settlements.

A small Imperial presence brings the planet an additional source of water, its most precious commodity. Though tasked to enforce the law, stormtroopers often overlook crime; an efficient black market also enables the procurement of illegal goods. Human settlers often become moisture farmers and live in subterranean dwellings in order to survive. Pipe systems distribute most of the harvested moisture to indoor crops supplying food for the farmers. Rare water sources such as springs in badlands (e.g. Beggar's Canyon) provide hydration for hermits and Tusken Raiders.
The planet is dominated by the Hutts, a clan of gangsters and crime lords. Since Tatooine was beyond the reach of the Galactic Republic, the Hutts presided over the lawless planet with little outside interference.  When the Galactic Empire subsumed the Old Republic, the new regime established only a token presence on Tatooine, which left Jabba the Hutt's reign unchallenged until his death during the events depicted in Return of the Jedi. The planet gained notability in what is an unknown galaxy as the homeworld of Luke Skywalker.

Inhabitants

 Humans – Settlers
 Hutts – Wormlike crime lords
 Jawas – Humanoid rodent scavengers and traders, and one of the native life forms of Tatooine
 Tusken Raiders (or Sand People) – Fierce, nomadic humanoids and one of the native life forms of Tatooine

Flora and fauna

Locations
Because Tatooine features so prominently in the Star Wars film series, a wide range of locations has been represented on-screen.

Settlements
Although the planet is sparsely populated, settlements of varying size have provided the settings for many scenes in Star Wars films.

The first settlement to be shown is Anchorhead where many human settlers on Tatooine pursue a difficult agrarian existence on remote "moisture farms" in the desert, collecting water vapor from the atmosphere to grow crops. Among these moisture farmers is the young hero of the film, Luke Skywalker, who resides with his Uncle Owen and Aunt Beru at the Lars Homestead. The region is dangerous, with kidnappings by Tusken Raiders being a major problem, as shown in Attack of the Clones (2002), when Luke's father Anakin, lost his mother to Tusken Raiders. In the original film, Luke also mentions Tosche Station (or Toshi Station), which was a mechanical repair shop featured in scenes that were deleted from the final cut of the original 1977 film. In the deleted scenes, Luke meets his young friends and bids farewell to Biggs Darklighter, who is about to leave to the Imperial Academy. The Jedi Obi-Wan Kenobi is also exiled near that region, although his house is remote from other houses, as he is hiding under the alias Ben.

Bestine is the "capital" of Tatooine; although it does not appear in any films, it is mentioned as "Bestine township" in the 1976 novelisation Star Wars: From the Adventures of Luke Skywalker and is featured prominently in Star Wars Galaxies video games. In the Expanded Universe, there is also a separate planet named Bestine.

Mos Pelgo briefly known as Freetown, was a town located in the northern hemisphere of the planet Tatooine. Seen in both Star Wars: The Old Republic: Knights of the Eternal Throne and The Mandalorian.

Spaceports
Two major spaceport locations have been shown on Tatooine:
Mos Eisley (Star Wars, 1977) is the planet's biggest city: a bustling spaceport with an active criminal underworld, described by Obi-Wan Kenobi a "wretched hive of scum and villainy." This is the location of one of the most noted scenes in Star Wars, Chalmun's Cantina, which is shown as a busy saloon bar-style establishment, patronised by exotic and often violent alien species. The Cantina additionally features as a location in Lego Star Wars video games and Fortnite. 

Mos Espa (The Phantom Menace, 1999) is home to the Boonta Eve Classic Podrace track. Anakin Skywalker spent his childhood in the city, along his mother Shmi; both were slaves under the ownership of Watto. Anakin became the first human to win the race against Sebulba and other Podracer pilots and earned his freedom in the process, due to a bet between Watto and Jedi Qui-Gon Jinn. The city's depiction in The Phantom Menace was intended to look larger than what was seen of Mos Eisley in the original Star Wars.

Desert locations
Tatooine is mostly a desert environment. Characters in the films make reference to the deserts by name: the Jundland Wastes, a rocky region, is the location of the Tusken Raider attack in Star Wars (1977), and the neighboring Dune Sea (the basin of an ancient ocean) is the setting for Jabba the Hutt's palace has the Rancor pit inside the palace. Also situated in the Dune Sea is the Great Pit of Carkoon, the lair of the deadly omnivorous Sarlacc creature.

Appearances

Films
 Star Wars (1977)
 The Empire Strikes Back (1980) (mentioned only)
 Return of the Jedi (1983)
 Star Wars: Episode I – The Phantom Menace (1999)
 Star Wars: Episode II – Attack of the Clones (2002)
 Star Wars: Episode III – Revenge of the Sith (2005)
 Star Wars: The Clone Wars (2008)
 Star Wars: The Force Awakens (2015) (mentioned only)
 Solo: A Star Wars Story (2018) (mentioned only)
Star Wars: The Rise of Skywalker (2019)

Television
 Star Wars Holiday Special (1978)
 Star Wars: The Clone Wars (2008-2020)
 Star Wars Rebels (2014–2018)
 The Mandalorian (2019–)
 The Book of Boba Fett (2021–)
 Obi-Wan Kenobi (2022)

Licensed parodies
 Phineas and Ferb: Star Wars (2014)
 Robot Chicken: Star Wars
 Robot Chicken: Star Wars Episode II
 Robot Chicken: Star Wars Episode III

Video games

Theme park attraction
Tatooine also appeared in the theme park attraction Star Tours - The Adventures Continue in Disney's Hollywood Studios in Walt Disney World Resort in Orlando, Florida and Disneyland Park in Disneyland Resort in Anaheim, California.

Similarity to real planets

The discovery of exoplanets in the real universe gained pace in the early 21st century. In 2015, the US space agency NASA published an article which stated that many of the newly discovered astronomical bodies possessed scientifically confirmed properties that are similar to planets in the fictional Star Wars universe. Among them, the planets TOI 1338 b, Kepler-16b and Kepler-453b have been likened to Tatooine because they have been discovered orbiting binary star systems.

Influence
The desert planet of Jakku in the Star Wars sequel trilogy film The Force Awakens (2015) has been noted as being very similar to Tatooine.

In August 2019, rapper Kanye West announced that he was designing prefabricated homes inspired by the settlements on Tatooine seen in A New Hope to serve as low-income housing. His prototypes in Calabasas, California were torn down after he was cited for not obtaining the proper permits and receiving complaints about the "gumdrop-shaped" structures. On July 5, 2020, West tweeted a photograph of similar structures being built to promote his presidential campaign.

See also

 List of Star Wars planets and moons
 Desert planet

References

Sources

External links

 
 

Star Wars planets
Fictional terrestrial planets
Fiction set on desert planets
Fictional elements introduced in 1977